The Giudecca Canal is a body of water that flows into the San Marco basin in Venice, Italy.

It is one of the major canals in the city, it bisects the sestieri of Dorsoduro, separating Giudecca island and district from Dorsoduro district.

Landmarks
Major buildings include:
Along the Giudecca district quay, Molino Stucky (19th century factory complex), Le Zitelle church, and the Il Redentore church by Palladio.
Along the Dorsoduro district side: Il Gesuati church on the Zattere quay, and at Punta della Dogana where Giudecca Canal and the Grand Canal meet, the Santa Maria della Salute church and Dogana da Mar, a former customs house and present day art museum−gallery.
Palazzo Giustinian Recanati

See also

External links 

Canals in Venice
Dorsoduro
Geography of Venice
Water transport in Venice
Waterways of Italy